The Firebird is a ballet and orchestral concert work by the Russian composer Igor Stravinsky. It was written for the 1910 Paris season of Sergei Diaghilev's Ballets Russes company; the original choreography was by Michel Fokine, who collaborated with Alexandre Benois on a scenario based on the Russian fairy tales of the Firebird and the blessing and curse it possesses for its owner. It was first performed at the Opéra de Paris on 25 June 1910 and was an immediate success, catapulting Stravinsky to international fame. Although designed as a work for the stage, with specific passages accompanying characters and action, the music achieved equal if not greater recognition as a concert piece.

Stravinsky was a young and virtually unknown composer when Diaghilev commissioned him to compose The Firebird for the Ballets Russes. Its success was the start of Stravinsky's partnership with Diaghilev, which would subsequently produce further ballet productions until 1928, including Petrushka (1911), The Rite of Spring (1913), and Apollo (1928).

History

Background 
Igor Stravinsky was the son of Fyodor Stravinsky, the principal bass at the Imperial Mariinsky Theatre in Saint Petersburg, and Anna (née Kholodovskaya), a competent amateur singer and pianist from an old established Russian family. Fyodor's association with many of the leading figures in Russian music, including Rimsky-Korsakov, Borodin and Mussorgsky, meant that Igor grew up in an intensely musical home. In 1901, Stravinsky began to study law at Saint Petersburg Imperial University, while taking private lessons in harmony and counterpoint. Sensing talent in the young composer's early efforts, Rimsky-Korsakov took Stravinsky under his private tutelage. By the time of his mentor's death in 1908, Stravinsky had produced several works, among them a Piano Sonata in F-sharp minor, a Symphony in E-flat, and a short orchestral piece titled Feu d'artifice ("Fireworks").

In 1909, Stravinsky's Scherzo fantastique and Feu d'artifice were premiered in Saint Petersburg. Among those in the audience was the impresario Sergei Diaghilev, who was about to debut his Ballets Russes in Paris. Diaghilev's intention was to present new works in a distinctively 20th-century style, and he was looking for fresh compositional talent. Impressed by Stravinsky, he commissioned from him orchestrations of Chopin's music for the ballet Les Sylphides.

Creation 
Alexandre Benois recalled that in 1908 he had suggested to Diaghilev the production of a Russian nationalist ballet, an idea all the more attractive given both the newly awakened French passion for Russian dance and the expense of staging opera. The idea of mixing the mythical Firebird with the unrelated Russian tale of Koschei the Deathless possibly came from a popular child's verse by Yakov Polonsky, "A Winter's Journey", which includes the lines:

And in my dreams I see myself on a wolf's back
Riding along a forest path
To do battle with a sorcerer-tsar (Koschei)
In that land where a princess sits under lock and key,
Pining behind massive walls.
There gardens surround a palace all of glass;
There Firebirds sing by night
And peck at golden fruit.

Benois collaborated with the choreographer Michel Fokine, drawing from several books of Russian fairy tales including the collection of Alexander Afanasyev, to concoct a story involving the Firebird and the evil magician Koschei. The scenery was designed by Aleksandr Golovin and the costumes by Léon Bakst.

Diaghilev first approached the Russian composer Anatoly Lyadov in September 1909 to write the music. There is no evidence that he ever accepted the commission, despite the anecdote that he was slow to start composing the work. Nikolai Tcherepnin composed some music for the ballet (which he later used in his The Enchanted Kingdom), but withdrew from the project without explanation after completing only one scene. After deciding against using Alexander Glazunov and Nikolay Sokolov, Diaghilev finally chose the 28-year-old Stravinsky, who had already begun sketching the music in anticipation of the commission.

Stravinsky would later remark about working with Fokine that it meant "nothing more than to say that we studied the libretto together, episode by episode, until I knew the exact measurements required of the music." Several ideas from Rimsky-Korsakov were used in The Firebird, most notably in the use of leitmotifs. Rimsky-Korsakov used ascending thirds as leitmotifs for villains in his operas Mlada, Pan Voyevoda, and Kashchey the Deathless, and Stravinsky harmonically extended this idea to build the harmonies in Firebird. The piano score was completed on 21 March 1910 and was fully orchestrated by May, although not before work was briefly interrupted by another Diaghilev commission: an orchestration of Grieg's Kobold, Op. 71, no. 3 for a charity ball dance featuring Vasily Nijinsky.

Soon thereafter, Diaghilev began to organize private previews of The Firebird for the press. French critic Robert Brussel, who attended one of these events, wrote in 1930:

The composer, young, slim, and uncommunicative, with vague meditative eyes, and lips set firm in an energetic looking face, was at the piano. But the moment he began to play, the modest and dimly lit dwelling glowed with a dazzling radiance. By the end of the first scene, I was conquered: by the last, I was lost in admiration. The manuscript on the music-rest, scored over with fine pencillings, revealed a masterpiece.

Reception 

The Firebird was premiered by the Ballets Russes at the Palais Garnier in Paris on 25 June 1910, conducted by Gabriel Pierné. Even before the first performance, the company sensed a huge success in the making; and every performance of the ballet in that first production, as Tamara Karsavina recalled, met a "crescendo" of success. "Mark him well," Diaghilev said of Stravinsky, "he is a man on the eve of celebrity."

Critics praised the ballet for its integration of decor, choreography and music. "The old-gold vermiculation of the fantastic back-cloth seems to have been invented to a formula identical with that of the shimmering web of the orchestra," wrote Henri Ghéon in Nouvelle revue française, who called the ballet "the most exquisite marvel of equilibrium" and added that Stravinsky was a "delicious musician." Michel-Dimitri Calvocoressi hailed the young composer as the legitimate heir to The Mighty Handful. The ballet’s success also secured Stravinsky's position as Diaghilev's star composer, and there were immediate talks of a sequel, leading to the composition of Petrushka and The Rite of Spring. In Russia, however, reaction was mixed. While Stravinsky's friend Andrey Rimsky-Korsakov spoke approvingly of it, the press mostly took a dim view of the music, with one critic denouncing what he considered its "horrifying poverty of melodic invention." A fellow Rimsky-Korsakov pupil, Jāzeps Vītols, wrote that "Stravinsky, it seems, has forgotten the concept of pleasure in sound... [His] dissonances unfortunately quickly become wearying, because there are no ideas hidden behind them."

Sergei Bertensson recalled Sergei Rachmaninoff saying of the music: "Great God! What a work of genius this is! This is true Russia!" Another colleague, Claude Debussy, who later became an admirer took a more sober view of the score: "What do you expect? One has to start somewhere." Richard Strauss told the composer in private conversation that he had made a "mistake" in beginning the piece pianissimo instead of astonishing the public with a "sudden crash." Shortly thereafter he summed up to the press his experience of hearing The Firebird for the first time by saying, "it's always interesting to hear one's imitators."

Subsequent ballet performances 

The Firebird was first revived in 1934 by Colonel Wassily de Basil's company, the Ballets Russes de Monte-Carlo, in a production staged in London, using the original decor and costumes from Diaghilev's company.

The ballet was staged by George Balanchine for the New York City Ballet in 1949 with Maria Tallchief as the Firebird and scenery and costumes by Marc Chagall, and was kept in the repertory until 1965. The company restaged it in 1970 for the David H. Koch Theater, with new costumes by Karinska based on Chagall's original designs. Jerome Robbins collaborated with Balanchine to choreograph the restaging.

The National Ballet of Canada created a version of the Firebird for television in 2003, in which special effects were used to make it appear that the Firebird is in flight. The Mariinsky Ballet performed the original choreography at Covent Garden in August 2011 as part of their Fokine retrospective, with Ekaterina Kondaurova as the Firebird.

On 29 March 2012, the American Ballet Theatre premiered the ballet with choreography by Alexei Ratmansky at the Segerstrom Center for the Arts, starring Natalia Osipova. The Royal Ballet staged 6 performances of the ballet at the Royal Opera House in June 2019, with Yasmine Naghdi performing the role of the Firebird.

Synopsis 
The ballet centers on the journey of its hero, Prince Ivan. While hunting in the forest, he strays into the magical realm of the evil Koschei the Immortal, whose immortality is preserved by keeping his soul in a magic egg hidden in a casket. Ivan chases and captures the Firebird and is about to kill her; she begs for her life, and he spares her. As a token of thanks, she offers him an enchanted feather that he can use to summon her should he be in dire need.

Prince Ivan then meets thirteen princesses who are under the spell of Koschei and falls in love with one of them, Tsarevna. The next day, Ivan confronts the magician and eventually they begin quarrelling. When Koschei sends his minions after Ivan, he summons the Firebird. She intervenes, bewitching the monsters and making them dance an elaborate, energetic dance (the "Infernal Dance").

Exhausted, the creatures and Koschei then fall into a deep sleep. While they sleep, the Firebird directs Ivan to a tree stump where the casket with the egg containing Koschei's soul is hidden. Ivan destroys the egg, and with the spell broken and Koschei dead, the magical creatures that Koschei held captive are freed and the palace disappears. All of the "real" beings, including the princesses, awaken and with one final hint of the Firebird's music (though in Fokine's choreography she makes no appearance in that final scene on-stage), celebrate their victory.

Music

Structure

The Firebird is dedicated to Andrey Rimsky-Korsakov, son of Nikolai Rimsky-Korsakov.

Instrumentation 
The work is scored for a large orchestra with the following instrumentation:

Woodwinds
 2 piccolos (2nd doubles 3rd flute)
 2 flutes
 3 oboes
 English horn
 3 clarinets in A (3rd doubles clarinet in D)
 bass clarinet in B
 3 bassoons (3rd doubles 2nd contrabassoon)
 contrabassoon

Brass
 4 horns in F
 3 trumpets in A
 3 trombones
 tuba
 3 onstage trumpets
 2 onstage tenor Wagner tubas
 2 onstage bass Wagner tubas

Percussion
 bass drum
 cymbals
 triangle
 tambourine
 tamtam
 glockenspiel
 xylophone

 piano
 celesta
 3 harps

 timpani

Strings
 first violins
 second violins
 violas
 cellos
 double basses

Suites and other derivative compositions 

Shortly after the completion of The Firebird, Stravinsky wrote a piano solo reduction of the whole ballet. Furthermore, besides the complete 50-minute ballet score of 1909–10, Stravinsky arranged three suites for concert performance which date from 1911, 1919, and 1945. The following is a description of most other derivative compositions from The Firebird:

1911 suite 

 Introduction – Kashchei's Enchanted Garden – Dance of the Firebird
 Supplication of the Firebird
 The Princesses' Game with Apples
 The Princesses' Khorovod (Rondo, round dance)
 Infernal Dance of all Kashchei's Subjects

Instrumentation: essentially as per the original ballet. The score was printed from the same plates, with only the new endings for the movements being newly engraved.

1919 suite 

 Introduction – The Firebird and its dance – The Firebird's variation
 The Princesses' Khorovod (Rondo, round dance)
 Infernal dance of King Kashchei
 Berceuse (Lullaby)
 Finale

Instrumentation: 2 flutes (2nd also piccolo); 2 oboes (2nd also English horn for one measure); 2 clarinets; 2 bassoons; 4 horns; 2 trumpets; 3 trombones; tuba; timpani; bass drum; cymbals; triangle; xylophone; harp; piano (also opt. celesta); strings.

This suite was created in Switzerland for conductor Ernest Ansermet. When it was originally published, the score contained many mistakes, which were only fixed in 1985.

1945 suite 

 Introduction – The Firebird and its dance – The Firebird's variation
 Pantomime I
 Pas de deux: Firebird and Ivan Tsarevich
 Pantomime II
 Scherzo: Dance of the Princesses
 Pantomime III
 The Princesses' Khorovod (Rondo, round dance)
 Infernal dance of King Kashchei
 Berceuse (Lullaby)
 Finale

Instrumentation: 2 Flutes (2nd also Piccolo); 2 Oboes; 2 Clarinets; 2 Bassoons; 4 Horns; 2 Trumpets; 3 Trombones; Tuba; Timpani; Bass Drum; Snare Drum; Tambourine; Cymbals; Triangle; Xylophone; Harp; Piano; Strings.

In 1945, shortly before he acquired American citizenship, Stravinsky was contacted by Leeds Music with a proposal to revise the orchestration of his first three ballets in order to recopyright them in the United States. The composer agreed, setting aside work on the finale of his Symphony in Three Movements. He proceeded to fashion a new suite based on the 1919 version, adding to it and reorchestrating several minutes of the pantomimes from the original score.

Danse infernale, berceuse et finale 
Pianist Guido Agosti also made a short reduction of three fragments from the ballet, specifically the three main numbers at the end. Dedicated to the memory of Ferruccio Busoni, the reduction process started in Forte dei Marmi, Italy in August 1928, and finished in Berlin in October 1928. The three-movement suite was written for solo piano. The movement list is as follows:

First recordings

In popular culture 

Excerpts from The Firebird were used in Bruno Bozzetto's 1976 animated film Allegro Non Troppo and in Walt Disney's animated film Fantasia 2000. 

Saviour Pirotta and Catherine Hyde's picture book, Firebird, is based on the original stories that inspired the ballet, and was published in 2010 to celebrate the ballet's centenary.

The influence of The Firebird has been felt beyond classical music. Stravinsky was an important influence on Frank Zappa, who used the melody from the Berceuse in his 1967 album Absolutely Free. Zappa also used some of Stravinsky's melodies from The Firebird and The Rite of Spring in his album with The Mothers of Invention, Absolutely Free. Prog rock band Yes has regularly used the ballet's finale as their "walk-on" music for concerts since 1971. Jazz musician and arranger Don Sebesky featured a mash-up of the piece, with the jazz fusion composition Birds of Fire by John McLaughlin, on his 1973 album Giant Box. During the 1980s and 1990s, the chord which opens the "Infernal Dance" became a widely used orchestra hit sample in music, specifically within new jack swing.

Firebird was used in the opening ceremony of Sochi 2014 during the Cauldron Lighting segment.

References

Citations

Sources 

 (New York, Atheneum. )

External links 

Ballets by Michel Fokine
Ballets by Igor Stravinsky
Ballets designed by Léon Bakst
1910 ballet premieres
Ballets Russes productions
1910 compositions
Orchestral suites
Ballets designed by Marc Chagall
Ballets by George Balanchine
Ballets by Jerome Robbins
Ballets designed by Barbara Karinska
Compositions that use extended techniques
Music based on European myths and legends
New York City Ballet repertory
Stefan Zweig Collection
Works about legendary creatures